St Michael's Uniting Church is a church in Collins Street in central Melbourne, Australia. Originally the Collins Street Independent Church, a Congregational Union of Australia Church, and later Collins Street Uniting Church, St Michael's has become well known as a centre of liberal theology and political radicalism under its recent Executive Minister Dr Francis Macnab (1971-2016).

History

The first church on this site was built in 1839-41, one of the first Churches in the Port Phillip District (now the state of Victoria). That Church was demolished in 1863 to make way for the present building, completed in 1866. It was designed by noted and successful architect Joseph Reed, who had also designed the Melbourne Town Hall, and later the Royal Exhibition Building. It is classified by the National Trust of Australia and listed by Heritage Victoria. In 1978 the interior underwent a major restoration, refurbishment and modification of the church was undertaken, raising the communion table, replacing the lectern, the choir and organ console moved, and the timber pews replaced with padded metal ones. Two candelabras flank the  communion table representing the ‘Devine presence’ and the “Light of the World’.

As part of Australia's Bicentennial in 1988, new stained glass windows by artist Klaus Zimmer were installed in the ground floor. The windows tell of the journey of humanity from the experience of aloneness and questioning towards the symbolic gateway of the New Jerusalem.

It was variously known as the Independent Church and the Congregational Church before it was given its present name in 1990. In 1991, the office tower development 120 Collins Street that surrounds the church was completed, built in part on church owned land.

Architecture

The building is described as 'Lombardic Romanesuqe' in style, and is considered the first example of polychrome brickwork in Victoria, a style that became very popular for all manner of buildings by the 1880s. It features a tall square bell tower marking the important street corner, and round Romanesque arches around doors and windows and the open cloisters in each side.

The interior was designed in the form of a theatre auditorium, in accordance with the principles of the Congregationalist Church, as a place where all members of the congregation could both hear and see the preacher. It features a sloping floor with tiered seating, and a steep gallery behind a ring of high aches on slender cast iron columns, ensuring good sight lines.

Key clergy

Rev Dr Margaret Mayman (2020)

Rev Dr Margaret Mayman was inducted as minister with St Michael's Uniting Church in February 2020. Margaret was born in New Zealand, and was ordained as a Presbyterian minister in 1983. She holds a PhD in Christian social ethics from Union Theological Seminary in New York, where she lived, studied and taught for 12 years. She was a parish minister in New Zealand for 18 years before moving to Sydney in December 2013 to be the minister at Pitt Street Uniting Church.

Dr Francis Macnab (1971-2016)

Dr Francis Macnab  was the executive minister of St Michael's from February 1971 to December 2016.
In addition to his duties as a minister, Macnab was also the founder and previous executive director of The Cairnmillar Institute, a non-for-profit clinic for counselling available to the general public and a postgraduate school of psychology, counselling and psychotherapy. Dr Macnab holds a Doctor of Divinity degree from the University of Aberdeen. He has honorary doctorates from the University of Melbourne and RMIT in psychology and applied science.

Through Cairnmillar and St Michael's, Macnab developed a healthy ageing program called Successful Ageing, Growth and Enjoyment (S.A.G.E.) for people aged between 55-105. He also recognised a need for The Big Tent Project, aimed at supporting kindergarten aged children suffering from mental health issues.

Supply ministry (since 2017) 
Since 1 January 2017 there have been supply ministers such as Reverend David Dawes, Rev Ric Holland, Reverend John Smith, and Reverend Peter Burnham and others visiting ministers.

Psychological services
"Mingary - the Quiet Place" is a contemplative space at St Michael's opened in 1999. Mingary also offers low-cost counselling under the supervision of the manager psychologist, Lynette Kramer. Mingary is run in conjunction with the Cairnmillar Institute and the Australian Foundation for Aftermath Reactions, both of which Francis Macnab founded. The minister since 1971,  Macnab holds degrees in psychology and is a fellow of the Australian Psychological Society.

Doctrine

New Faith 

In September 2008, Dr Francis Macnab launched what he called a "New Faith" including posters reading "The Ten Commandments, one of the most negative documents ever written." Macnab described Moses as a mass murderer, Abraham as concocted and Jesus as a Jewish peasant and certainly not God. The then Moderator of the Synod of Victoria and Tasmania, the Rev'd Jason Kioa, described Dr Macnab's comments challenging the divinity of Jesus as questioning some of the faith's most basic beliefs, turning away from 2000 years of "orthodox Christian belief". Other members of the Synod published their concerns. The Synod of Victoria and Tasmania directed St Michael's Uniting Church to remove advertising for its new faith and apologise to Jews, Christians and Muslims for the comments it contained about the Ten Commandments. The Uniting Church did not move to discipline Macnab because no formal complaint had been received.

In an address on 5 October 2008, Dr Macnab defended his comments, including against suggestions they were offensive to Jews, citing his study in undergraduate and postgraduate work in Hebrew language and history, including distinctions, and saying "Some of the comments have been knee-jerk reactions, uninformed and heavily overloaded with bad manners." He also stated, "While I have no intention of denigrating the Ten Commandments as a sacred symbol of the Jewish Torah and the Old Covenant, I say they are negative." He gave eight reasons why he believes the Ten Commandments to be negative and outlined his alternative 10 Commandments, which he described as "positive, plausible and powerful"

 Believe in a Good Presence in your life. Call that Good Presence: God, G-D - and follow that Good presence so that you live life fully - tolerantly, collaboratively, generously and with dignity.
 Believe in a God-Presence in your life that will lift you constantly to live harmoniously in yourself and with others, always searching for your best health and happiness.
 Take care of your home, your environments, your Planet and its vital resources for the life and health of people in all the world.
 Be kind and caring of the animals, the birds, and the creatures of land and the rivers and the seas.
 Help people develop their potential and become as fully functioning human beings as is possible from birth, through traumas and triumph to the end of their days.
 Be magnanimous and excessive in your support of good causes, and use your affluence and material goods and scientific skills in altruistic concern for the future of the world.
 Study ways to encourage and sustain the dignity, hope and integrity of all human beings and study ways to help all human beings embrace their dignity, hope, and integrity.
 Be alive to new possibilities, new ways, and to the unfolding mysteries and wonders of life and the world.
 We often focus our lives on many things and pursuits that promise our fulfilment. Study the deeper things of the Spirit, and the things of ultimate concern for all human beings. Be part of an evolving life-enhancing Faith that will also bring a new resilience to the future.
 Take time to worship the great Source of all the positive transforming energies of life, and search to be at one with "the spirit of the good, the tender and the beautiful"

References

External links
St Michael's Church website

1839 establishments in Australia
Michael
Churches completed in 1839
Lombard architecture
Collins Street, Melbourne
Buildings and structures in Melbourne City Centre
Heritage-listed buildings in Melbourne